Sylvestris, a Latin word meaning of the forest, may refer to:

Subspecies 
 Banksia dallanneyi subsp. sylvestris, a subspecies of Banksia dallanneyi
 Equus caballus sylvestris, the domestic horse, a mammal species
 Vitis vinifera subsp. sylvestris, a wild subspecies of grapevine

See also 
 Silvestris (disambiguation)
 Sylvestre (disambiguation)